Emma Leslie was the pseudonym of Emma Boultwood (1838–1909), an English writer of children's books and historical fiction. She wrote over one hundred books.

Life
Emma Boultwood was born in 1838 in Greenwich. Her younger sister, Harriet Boultwood, also became a novelist. She started writing in the 1860s, publishing children's and historical fiction for the Religious Tract Society and the Sunday School Union. She died and was buried in Pwllcrochan Churchyard Pembroke, Wales.

References

External links
 

1838 births
1909 deaths
19th-century English novelists
19th-century English women
English children's writers
English historical novelists
English women novelists